Possession Point is a former point of land on the northwestern coast of Hong Kong Island in Hong Kong, before land reclamation moved the location further inland.

History 
The area is where Commodore Gordon Bremer, commander-in-chief of British forces in China, took formal possession of Hong Kong on 26 January 1841, and this date is considered as the founding of Hong Kong.  

Captain Edward Belcher, who surveyed the island in 1841, wrote: "We landed on Monday, the 25th, 1841, at fifteen minutes past eight A. M., and being the bona fide first possessors, Her Majesty's health was drank with three cheers on Possession Mount." Accompanied by officers of the naval squadron the next day, Bremer took formal possession, under a feu de joie from the Royal Marines and a royal salute from the men-of-war ships. The hoisting of the Union Jack was possibly done by either William Dowell, who was a midshipman during the ceremony, or Mohammed Arab, who served in either the Bengal Volunteers or 37th Madras Native Infantry.

The area, which came to be known as Possession Point, was kept an open space, and used for recreation by the local Chinese, who called it Tai Tat Tei (大笪地). It was developed in the 1980s and formed into a hotel and commercial complex, which is also the site of the Hong Kong–Macau Ferry Terminal.

The point has now disappeared from the coastline, but Possession Street and the sudden turn of Queen's Road West reveals its original location. In maps of the 1980s and before, Hollywood Road Park is marked as Possession Point. This marks the original site which, owing to land reclamation, is no longer located on the coast.

The Chinese name, 水坑口 (Shui Hang Hau), means the mouth of water trench, reflecting the mouth of a stream that flowed down from Victoria Peak.

See also
Convention of Chuenpi
History of Hong Kong (1800s–1930s)

References

External links 

Central and Western Heritage Trail – Old Site of the Possession Point (Shui Hang Hau)

 
History of Hong Kong
Places in Hong Kong